Ji Eun-sung (born August 3, 1991) is a South Korean actor. He is perhaps best known for his roles in the television series Shine or Go Crazy (2015) and Reverse (2017–2018).

Filmography

Film

Television

References

External links
 

1991 births
Living people
Gwangju University alumni
IHQ (company) artists
21st-century South Korean male actors
South Korean male television actors
South Korean male film actors